Sacha Rohmann (born 3 August 1980) is a retired Luxembourgian football defender.

References

1980 births
Living people
Luxembourgian footballers
US Rumelange players
Jeunesse Esch players
CS Grevenmacher players
Association football defenders
Luxembourg international footballers